New Freedom is a borough in York County, Pennsylvania. As of the 2020 census, the borough had a population of 4,874. Once an industrial/railroad town, the community has evolved into a mostly residential town.

History
New Freedom Borough is located in the southern portion of York County, Pennsylvania. The borough borders the Mason-Dixon line and was incorporated in 1873. Originally named “Freedom” for the Free family, there was another town already in existence with that name, so New Freedom was chosen as the official name.

People of German, English, and Scotch-Irish descent settled the area. The rich, fertile soil provided a comfortable living for farming and agricultural opportunities.  Summers Canning Company operated in the town for years, canning the freshest harvests and then shipping the final products.  Summers Canning Company was sold to Hanover Foods in 1984. A mural depicting scenes from the Summers Canning Company is displayed on a building along the York County Heritage Rail Trail.

The Northern Central Railway was a primary factor for early growth of the town. The rail service established a vital means of commerce and transportation until Hurricane Agnes in 1972 destroyed much of the rail line and bridges in York County.

Located 30 miles north of Baltimore, Maryland and 38 miles south of Harrisburg, Pennsylvania, the town is changing from an area of commerce and minor industry to a commuter community.

Geography
New Freedom is located at  (39.736703, −76.698541).

Demographics

As of the census of 2000, there were 3,512 people, 1,296 households, and 1,031 families residing in the borough. The population density was 1,711.8 people per square mile (661.5/km2). There were 1,340 housing units at an average density of 653.1 per square mile (252.4/km2). The racial makeup of the borough was 96.53% White, 0.77% African American, 0.14% Native American, 1.40% Asian, 0.03% Pacific Islander, 0.09% from other races, and 1.05% from two or more races. Hispanic or Latino of any race were 0.48% of the population.

There were 1,296 households, out of which 38.4% had children under the age of 18 living with them, 70.1% were married couples living together, 7.1% had a female householder with no spouse present, and 20.4% were non-families. 16.9% of all households were made up of individuals, and 7.3% had someone living alone who was 65 years of age or older. The average household size was 2.70 and the average family size was 3.04.

In the borough the population was spread out, with 26.2% under the age of 18, 5.8% from 18 to 24, 29.0% from 25 to 44, 27.8% from 45 to 64, and 11.3% who were 65 years of age or older. The median age was 40 years. For every 100 females there were 94.9 males. For every 100 females age 18 and over, there were 93.8 males.

The median income for a household in the borough was $66,458, and the median income for a family was $70,319. Males had a median income of $46,563 versus $31,576 for females. The per capita income for the borough was $24,828. About 1.3% of families and 2.7% of the population were below the poverty line, including 1.3% of those under age 18 and 11.7% of those age 65 or over.

Community
 The York County Heritage Rail Trail cuts through the center of New Freedom. The trail also connects to  Northern Central Railroad Trail in Maryland, heading south from the Mason-Dixon line.

Popular seasonal events in New Freedom include:
 The New Freedom Lions Club Carnival, held annually in July since the 1930s
 The Annual New Freedom Fest held the third weekend of September, a revival of the New Freedom's Farmers Improvement Fair that was held this same weekend in the early 1900s for many years
 Outdoor Movie Night held three times each summer where families can gather with their blankets and lawn chairs and enjoy a classic movie.

Currently, a new community park is being built in the middle of town, which will be known as the "Freedom Greene."

New Freedom teens attend Susquehannock High School and Southern Middle School, part of Pennsylvania's Southern York County School District, as well as private schools including Shrewsbury Christian Academy, York Catholic High School, or York Country Day School. In 2010, St. John the Baptist opened a new Roman Catholic Parochial School in the New Freedom borough.

New Freedom is home to the D. Landreth Seed Company, which is the oldest seed company in America.

Notable people
 Sterling Ruby, American artist who works in ceramics, painting, drawing, collage, sculpture and video.
 Ron Wolf, Former general manager of the National Football League's Green Bay Packers and 2015 inductee to the Professional Football Hall of Fame.

References

External links

 Borough of New Freedom official website
 New Freedom Heritage Organization

Populated places established in 1783
Boroughs in York County, Pennsylvania